Efstratia (Effie) Kalfagianni is a Greek American mathematician specializing in low-dimensional topology.

Early life 
Kalfagianni was born in 1965 in Greece. She lived on a small Greek island most of her early life.  She started getting into math as a sophomore in high school because of classes in  euclidean geometry and elementary number theory. Her teachers encouraged her to pursue math in college as well.

Education and Career
Kalfagianni graduated from Aristotle University of Thessaloniki in October 1987. After earning a master's degree in 1990 at Fordham University,
she moved to Columbia University for doctoral studies, earning a second master's degree in 1991 and completing her Ph.D. in 1995. Her dissertation, Finite Type Invariants for Knots in 3-Manifolds, was supervised by Joan Birman and Xiao-Song Lin .

After postdoctoral study at the Institute for Advanced Study and three years as Hill Assistant Professor at Rutgers University, she moved to Michigan State University in 1998. She was promoted to full professor in 2008 and received the MSU William J. Beal Outstanding Faculty Award in 2019.

Contributions
Kalfagianni works  in knot theory, three-manifolds, hyperbolic geometry, quantum topology and the interplay of these fields.

Kalfagianni is an editor for the New York Journal of Mathematics. She was also one of the editors of the book Interactions Between Hyperbolic Geometry, Quantum Topology and Number Theory (Contemporary Mathematics
Volume: 541, AMS, 2011) .

Book
With David Futer and Jessica Purcell, Kalfagianni is co-author of the research monograph Guts of Surfaces and the Colored Jones Polynomial (Lecture Notes in Mathematics 2069, Springer, 2013).  The monograph derives relations between colored Jones polynomials, the topology of incompressible spanning surfaces in knot and link complements and hyperbolic geometry.

Recognition
Kalfagianni was a member at the Institute for Advanced Study in 1994–1995 in 2004-2005 and in the Fall term of 2019.

She was included in the 2019 class of fellows of the American Mathematical Society "for contributions to knot theory and 3-dimensional topology, and for mentoring".

References

External links
Home page

Publications

Year of birth missing (living people)
Living people
20th-century American mathematicians
21st-century American mathematicians
American women mathematicians
Greek mathematicians
Greek women mathematicians
Topologists
Aristotle University of Thessaloniki alumni
Fordham University alumni
Columbia University alumni
Rutgers University faculty
Michigan State University faculty
Fellows of the American Mathematical Society
20th-century women mathematicians
21st-century women mathematicians
20th-century American women
21st-century American women